midcity is the official debut mixtape by experimental hip hop group clipping. It was independently self-released on February 5, 2013.

Track listing

Personnel
clipping.
 Daveed Diggs – vocals
 William Hutson & Jonathan Snipes – production

Other personnel
 Derrick "Baseck" Estrada – vocals (3)
 TiVO – vocals (4)
 Kill Rogers – vocals (4 & 10)
 Jalene Goodwin – vocals (6)
 Ezra Buchla – vocals (13)

References

2013 mixtape albums
Self-released albums
Clipping. albums
Albums free for download by copyright owner